Elsabé Antoinette Murray Joubert OIS (19 October 1922 – 14 June 2020) was a Sestigers Afrikaans-language writer. She rose to prominence with her novel Die swerfjare van Poppie Nongena (The Long Journey of Poppie Nongena), which was translated into 13 languages, as well as staged as a drama and filmed as Poppie Nongena.

Early life and career
Elsa Joubert was born and raised in the Cape settlement of Paarl and matriculated from the all-girls school La Rochelle in Paarl in 1939. She then studied at the University of Stellenbosch from which she graduated with a Bachelor of Arts degree in 1942 and an SED (Secondary Education Diploma) in 1943. She continued her studies at the University of Cape Town which she left with a Master's degree in Dutch-Afrikaans literature in 1945.

After graduating, Joubert taught at the Hoër Meisieskool, an all-girls high school in Cradock, then worked as the editor of the women's pages of Huisgenoot, a well-known Afrikaans family magazine, from 1946 to 1948. She then started writing full-time and travelled extensively in Africa, from the springs of the Nile in Uganda, through the Sudan, to Cairo, as well as to Mozambique, Mauritius, Réunion, Madagascar, and Angola. She also visited Indonesia.

In 1950, Joubert married Klaas Steytler, a journalist and later publisher and author, who died in 1998. She had three children, two daughters and one son, and lived in Oranjezicht, Cape Town.

She died in Cape Town on 14 June 2020 due to COVID-19-related causes during the COVID-19 pandemic in South Africa. In May 2020, during the pandemic, she wrote an open letter  to relax restrictions and allow home care residents to see family. “We are in the last months and weeks of our lives,” she wrote, “and we who live in homes or institutions, however wonderful, are totally cut off from our family members.”

Awards
 Fellow of the British Royal Society of Literature
 Honorary doctorate from Stellenbosch University (2001)
 Eugène Marais Prize for Ons wag op die kaptein (1964)
 CNA Prize for Bonga (1971)
 W.A. Hofmeyr Prize, for Poppy Nongena (1979)
 W.A. Hofmeyr Prize and Hertzog Prize for Die reise van Isobelle
 Louis Luyt Prize and CNA Prize (1997)
 Winifred Holtby Memorial Prize of the Royal Society of Literature for Poppie (1980)
 Olivier Award for the best play (London)
 Obi Award for best script (New York City)
 Hertzog Prize for prose (1998)

List of works

Travelogues
 Water en woestyn (Uganda en Kaïro), Dagbreek Boekhandel, 1957
 Die verste reis (Wes-Europa), 1959
 Suid van die wind (Madagaskar), 1962
 Die staf van Monomotapa (Mosambiek), 1964
 Swerwer in die Herfsland (Oos-Europa), 1968
 Die nuwe Afrikaan (Angola), Tafelberg, 1974
 Gordel van Smarag (Indonesië), Tafelberg, 1997

Novels and short stories
 Ons wag op die kaptein – To die at sunset, Tafelberg, 1963
 Die Wahlerbrug, Tafelberg, 1969
 Bonga, Tafelberg, 1971
 Die swerfjare van Poppie Nongena, Tafelberg, 1978 – The long journey of Poppie Nongena (1980), translated into 13 languages and also performed on stage as drama
 Melk (Short Stories), Tafelberg, 1980
 Die laaste Sondag –  The last Sunday, Tafelberg, 1983
 Poppie – die drama (co-author Sandra Kotzé), 1984
 Die vier vriende, 1985 – The four friends (1987) (children's book)
 Missionaris, 1988
 Dansmaat (Short Stories), Tafelberg, 1993
 Die reise van Isobelle, Tafelberg, 1995
 Twee Vroue, Tafelberg, 2002

Autobiographies
 'n Wonderlike Geweld, Tafelberg, 2005 – A Lion on the Landing (2014), translated into English by Irene Wainwright
 Reisiger, Tafelberg, 2010
 Spertyd , Tafelberg, 2017

References

External links
 
  Obituary.

1922 births
2020 deaths
Afrikaner people
Anti-apartheid activists
Sestigers
Stellenbosch University alumni
University of Cape Town alumni
Fellows of the Royal Society of Literature
Hertzog Prize winners for prose
South African women novelists
South African travel writers
Women travel writers
South African women short story writers
South African short story writers
Recipients of the Order of Ikhamanga
Deaths from the COVID-19 pandemic in South Africa